is a video game series developed by Tose and published by Nintendo. The series is the only franchise for which Tose owns the copyright, which they share with Nintendo; as a result, Tose, which normally does not put their company name on their games, does so in the Starfy series. The series began in 2002 with Densetsu no Stafy for the Game Boy Advance, and four sequels were released. For its first seven years, Starfy games were not released outside Japan. The fifth and latest game in the series was released as The Legendary Starfy in North America on June 8, 2009.

Games
The following is a list of games released in the series. Games predating Taiketsu! Daīru Kaizokudan were only released in Japan. As a result, there are no English language titles for these games. An English language title may be given if any Nintendo division outside Japan elects to localize any of these games or feature any of them in a game from another series.

Gameplay
The Legendary Starfy series are platform games, focusing more on swimming than running and jumping around. Players control the protagonist of the series, Starfy, throughout each game; from the third title onward, Starfy's sister Starly is also playable occasionally. When on land, the controls are equal to the controls of most other platform games. When in the water, players can only move Starfy around using the control pad alone; however, if players want to make Starfy swim faster, they hold the B button down while moving him around. The games are usually composed of multiple stages or worlds, with each stage split up into four sub-stages. Boss characters hide at the end of each world's final sub-stage. Most of the other sub-stages' goals are centered around retrieving a lost or stolen item for another character. Most power-ups are vehicles and costumes. Some are new moves, and some are upgrades for moves and other power-ups.

Marketing
Although there had always been plans to bring the series to North America, the reason why the series stayed in Japan until the announcement of the fifth game was because Nintendo of America had declared the series to be "too Japanese". Nintendo of America has also considered bringing the other four games to North America in some form as well as expanding the series to the Wii, depending on "fan response".

Commercials
The animated television commercials loosely take place in the plot of whatever title is being advertised, as well as its gameplay. The settings and actions were slightly different compared to the ones in the titles they advertised. For instance, in the first The Legendary Starfy title, Starfy was walking inside the Tenkai Palace while carrying some stuff, including the Magic Jar holding the antagonist, Ogura, until Starfy tripped and dropped the stuff he was carrying, while the Magic Jar fell into the ocean below the Tenkai Palace. But in one of the commercials for the first title of the series, Starfy was walking outside of Tenkai Palace while only carrying the Magic Jar, until he tripped and fell in the ocean along with the Magic Jar. Except for Densetsu no Stafy 3, its commercial is the only one in The Legendary Starfy series that has a different setting. Instead of taking place anywhere in the game, the commercial takes place in a sushi bar, where the characters are standing on plates while being moved around on a conveyor belt. In the Japanese commercials for Densetsu no Stafy 4 and Densetsu no Stafy Taiketsu! Daīru Kaizokudan go back to the way the commercials for the first two titles of the series were, by making them loosely based on the plots of whatever is being advertised.

While Densetsu no Stafy Taiketsu! Daīru Kaizokudan was being planned for release in North America as The Legendary Starfy, a new live-action English commercial for it takes place on a boat "The Falling Star", where an old man and his grandson, fishing, talk about catching a giant squid, the grandson is worried, until the old man assures his grandson that he doesn't have to worry, because he has Starfy. Starfy then pops out of the sea. This is the first North American commercial, airing on May 25, 2009.

Merchandise
During the release of each game in the series, there have been many kinds of merchandise related to the series released in Japanese retail stores, like plush dolls, pencils, birthday balloons and playing cards. Nintendo also officially produced a manga version of the Densetsu no Stafy series and later, Densetsu no Stafy R with Shogakukan. CD soundtracks from the Starfy series were also released. The one used to promote the first The Legendary Starfy game was sung by BECKY. Kazuki Saya sung to promote Densetsu no Stafy 2. The J-pop group Perfume became the first group to sing the theme song, which was used to promote Densetsu no Stafy 3 during the credits of a Japanese television show Oha-Sta. Despite that being made, it wasn't released in retail stores. In the commercials for Densetsu no Stafy 3, Perfume's song titled Vitamin Drop, was the only song played in a Starfy series commercial that isn't related to the series. Another J-pop group Cute recorded the theme song to promote Densetsu no Stafy 4. The Legendary Starfy, unlike other games in the series, was never promoted with a vocal song nor a CD album by a J-pop singer nor group.

Manga 

 is a manga series produced by Shogakukan and Nintendo. It is based on The Legendary Starfy video game series, specifically the first and second titles in the series. It was serialized in the Shogakukan magazine CoroCoro Comic from its June 2002 issue to its October 2005 issue. Two tankōbon (bound volumes) collecting the individual chapters were released on October 28, 2003 and September 28, 2005.

The manga series later got a sequel titled . It is based on the same video game series as Densetsu no Stafy, specifically Densetsu no Stafy 4. This manga is also titled  It was serialized in CoroCoro Comic from its April 2006 issue to April 2008 issue. A single volume was released on July 28, 2008.

Other appearances in media
While only one of The Legendary Starfy games is released outside Japan, some references from the series have made cameo appearances in a few games that were released internationally. In Mario & Luigi: Superstar Saga for the Game Boy Advance, a poster in the Yoshi Theater resembles the box art of the first game in the series also for the Game Boy Advance, but titled in English as "Legend of Stafy". In Super Princess Peach for the Nintendo DS, an enemy called "Starfish" resembles the Starfy sprites of Densetsu no Stafy 4, as well as The Legendary Starfy, but with sunglasses. In the Japanese version of Donkey Konga, one of the songs is the main theme song of the series. Starfy appears in Super Smash Bros. Brawl as one of the summonable Assist Trophy characters, as well as a couple of in-game Stickers and a regular Trophy, and is once again referred to as "Stafy". He attacks by using his signature spin attack against the opponents of whoever summoned him, but unlike most, he can be attacked and defeated. He comes back with the same role in Super Smash Bros. for Nintendo 3DS and Wii U and Super Smash Bros. Ultimate. Starfy has also become an unlockable costume with his own course in Super Mario Maker.

Notes

References

Shōnen manga
Tose (company) games
Video game franchises
Nintendo franchises
Video game franchises introduced in 2002
Video games with underwater settings
Video games about children
Video games set on fictional planets